Coniopteryx is a genus of insects belonging to the family Coniopterygidae.

The genus was first described by Curtis in 1834.

The genus has cosmopolitan distribution.

Species:
 Coniopteryx pygmaea
 Coniopteryx tineiformis

References

Coniopterygidae
Neuroptera genera